Víctor Ignacio Malcorra (born 24 July 1987) is an Argentine professional footballer who plays as a left winger for Argentine club Rosario Central.

Career
On 11 June 2016, Malcorra signed for Club Tijuana from Unión de Santa Fé. On 4 June 2018, he moved to Pumas UNAM.

References

External links
 
 
 

1987 births
Living people
People from Río Negro Province
Argentine footballers
Association football wingers
Argentine Primera División players
Liga MX players
Comisión de Actividades Infantiles footballers
Aldosivi footballers
Unión de Santa Fe footballers
Club Tijuana footballers
Club Universidad Nacional footballers
Atlas F.C. footballers
Club Atlético Lanús footballers
Rosario Central footballers
Argentine expatriate footballers
Argentine expatriate sportspeople in Mexico
Expatriate footballers in Mexico